Mniotype bathensis is a moth belonging to the family Noctuidae. The species was first described by Lutzau in 1905.

It is native to Eurasia.

References

Cuculliinae